Turn- und Sportverein Bochum 1908 was a German association football club from the city of Bochum, North Rhine-Westphalia.

History
The club was established in 1908 as Spiel und Sport 08 Bochum. The first football match at the Castroper Straße (Ruhrstadion) was played by Spiel und Sport on 8 October 1911. On 1 April 1919 the club merged with Turnverein zu Bochum 1848 to form the TuS Bochum 1848. On 1 February 1924 the two clubs from the earlier merger split into the Bochumer Turnverein 1848 (gymnastics department) and Turn- und Sportverein Bochum 1908 (football, track and field, handball, hockey and tennis departments).

German football was reorganized in 1933 under the Third Reich into 16 top-flight divisions and after a divisional title in the Bezirksliga Westfalen (II) followed by a successful promotion playoff, TuS became part of the Gauliga Westfalen (I). The club played just two seasons there and finished their 1936–37 campaign in the relegation zone.

TuS was forced under the Nazi regime into a merger for political reasons with other local clubs. On 14 April 1938, TuS, Germania Bochum, and Turnverein Bochum were formed into current-day side VfL Bochum.

The newly combined club continued to compete in the top flight as part of the Gauliga Westfalen in the place of Germania Bochum.

League results

References

External links
Das deutsche Fußball-Archiv historical German domestic league tables 

Football clubs in Germany
Defunct football clubs in Germany
Defunct football clubs in North Rhine-Westphalia
Association football clubs established in 1908
1908 establishments in Germany
1938 disestablishments in Germany
Association football clubs disestablished in 1938